Kastor may refer to:
Castor and Pollux, twin brothers in Greek and Roman mythology
Kastor und Pollux, a complex of two towers in Frankfurt am Main, Germany, named after the mythological characters
Kastor, an unrelated character in the 2002 video game Age of Mythology
Kastor, a Greek grammarian and rhetorician

Kastor is also the surname of:
Adolph Kastor, a founder of Camillus Cutlery Company
Deena Kastor (born 1973), an American long-distance runner

See also
Castor (disambiguation)
Gastor (disambiguation)
Kastro (disambiguation)